Canarium denticulatum is a tree in the family Burseraceae. The specific epithet  is from the Latin meaning "small teeth", referring to the leaf margin.

Description
The bark is smooth and grey-white. The flowers are white.

Distribution and habitat
Canarium denticulatum grows naturally in the Andaman Islands, Burma and western Malesia. Its habitat is lowland mixed dipterocarp forest from sea-level to  altitude.

References

denticulatum
Flora of the Andaman Islands
Trees of Myanmar
Trees of Malesia
Plants described in 1826